Geve is a surname. Notable people with the surname include:

 Augustine Geve (died 2002), Solomon Islands priest and politician
 Nicolaus Georg Geve (1712–1789), Danish painter and illustrator
 Thomas Geve (born 1929), German engineer